Two human polls make up the 2021–22 NCAA Division I men's basketball rankings, the AP Poll and the Coaches Poll, in addition to various publications' preseason polls.

Legend

AP Poll

USA Today Coaches Poll

See also
2021–22 NCAA Division I women's basketball rankings

References

College men's basketball rankings in the United States